Tamil Hindus are the Tamil-speaking people who follow Hinduism. 

Hinduism was the first religion to reach the ancient Tamil kingdoms. Tamil Nadu is home to one of the largest functioning Hindu temples in the world. Tamil influence was one of the contributing factors in survival of Hinduism in Sri Lanka and its spreading in South East Asia. Before the Vedic period, many of them followed the ancient Dravidian folk religion. The Hinduism practiced by Tamils today is a fusion of Vedic and Dravidian traditions. There are notable population of Tamil Hindus in Sri Lanka and in Indian states of Tamil Nadu, with small populations in Kerala and Karnataka. Though they are present in many countries as diaspora. During the Sri Lankan Civil War, many Tamils emigrated and Hindu temples were built abroad by the Sri Lankan Tamil diaspora to maintain their religion, tradition and culture.

Religion 

Murugan is often known as the "Tamil god" and is considered by many to be the patron god of the Tamil language and Tamil people. There are a lot of temples dedicated to Murugan in Tamil Nadu and Sri Lanka. The Six Abodes of Murugan in Tamil Nadu are considered to be the most sacred abodes of Murugan and was mentioned in ancient Sangam literature. Most of the Tamil Hindus are followers of the Shaiva Siddhanta branch of Shaivism, Vaishnavism, and Shaktism. Many Tamils of rural regions have their village deities, and earlier had been followers of the Dravidian folk religion.

Culture

Festivals 

Thaipusam or Thaipoosam is the festival of the Tamil Hindus which falls on the full moon in the Tamil month of Thai. The festival is celebrated by Tamil Hindus in various countries.

Cuisine 

Most of the Tamil cuisine is directly influenced by the Hindu culture, though there is a mixture of both a vegetarian and a non-vegetarian diet. Most of it has its influence of South India and Sri Lanka. On special occasions, traditional Tamil dishes are served in a traditional manner, using banana leaves in place of utensils. After eating, the banana leaves are then used as a secondary food for cattle. A typical breakfast meal consists of idli or dosa with chutney. Lunch includes rice, sambar, Curd, kuzhambu, and rasam. The Iyengars and Iyers often have very authentic cuisine with many customs and rituals. Though many of them consume non-vegetarian, including pork, but not beef due to religious prohibition.

See also 

 Tamil Jain
 Tamil Muslim
 List of Tamil people

References

External links 

 

Social groups of Tamil Nadu
 Tamil
Hindu ethnic groups
Hindu communities